Alison "Ali" Rabe is an American politician and attorney who is a member of the Idaho Senate for the 16th district and served as a member of the Idaho Senate for the 17th district from December 2020 to November 2021.

Early life and education 
Rabe was born in Boise, Idaho, and raised in Middleton, Idaho. She earned a Bachelor of Arts from the College of Idaho and a Juris Doctor from the William & Mary Law School.

Career 
During law school, Rabe was an intern in the United States Senate. In 2011, she was a peace-building fellow with the International Bridges to Justice in Cambodia. She also worked as a law clerk in the Norfolk, Virginia Public Defender's Office. In 2012, she was a legal fellow in the United Nations Office on Drugs and Crime. After working as a legal fellow in Washington, D.C., she became an asylum officer with the United States Citizenship and Immigration Services in San Francisco.

From 2017 to 2019, she was a staff attorney at Homebase, a non-profit public interest law firm based in San Francisco. In 2019, Rabe returned to Boise, Idaho, where she became the executive director of Jesse Tree, a non-profit social services organization that provides legal representation to homeless individuals in the Treasure Valley region.

Elections 
Rabe was a candidate for the 17th district in the Idaho Senate. Rabe defeated Adriel J. Martinez in the Democratic primary with 75.82% of the vote. On November 5, 2021, Rabe announced that she was moving outside of District 17 and will not be able to finish her term in the Senate.

Rabe was a candidate for the 16th district in the Idaho Senate. Rabe defeated Republican nominee Gary Smith in the November general election with 61.8% of the vote.

References 

Living people
People from Boise, Idaho
Idaho lawyers
People from Middleton, Idaho
College of Idaho alumni
William & Mary Law School alumni
Women state legislators in Idaho
Democratic Party Idaho state senators
Year of birth missing (living people)